William Fell Giles (April 8, 1807 – March 21, 1879) was a United States representative from Maryland and later a United States district judge of the United States District Court for the District of Maryland.

Education and career

Born on April 8, 1807, in Harford County, Maryland, Giles attended a private academy and the Bel Air Academy, then read law in 1829. Giles was admitted to the bar and entered private practice in Baltimore, Maryland from 1829 to 1837, in 1839, from 1841 to 1844, and from 1847 to 1853. He was a member of the Maryland House of Delegates in 1838 and 1840.

Other service

Giles was an officer of the American Colonization Society for more than thirty years, and for more than twenty years one of the commissioners of the State of Maryland supervising the emigration of free blacks to Liberia.

Congressional service

Giles was elected as a Democrat from Maryland's 4th congressional district to the United States House of Representatives of the 29th United States Congress, serving from March 4, 1845, to March 3, 1847. He declined to be a candidate for renomination.

Federal judicial service

Giles received a recess appointment from President Franklin Pierce on July 18, 1853, to a seat on the United States District Court for the District of Maryland vacated by Judge John Glenn. He was nominated to the same position by President Pierce on December 19, 1853. He was confirmed by the United States Senate on January 11, 1854, and received his commission the same day. His service terminated on March 21, 1879, due to his death in Baltimore. He was interred in Green Mount Cemetery in Baltimore.

Notable case

Giles issued the original writ of habeas corpus in Ex parte Merryman.

See also
 Ex parte Merryman

References

Sources

Further reading
 William H. Rehnquist (1998), All the Laws but One:  Civil Liberties in Wartime, New York:  Morrow, .

1807 births
1879 deaths
Democratic Party members of the Maryland House of Delegates
Judges of the United States District Court for the District of Maryland
United States federal judges appointed by Franklin Pierce
19th-century American judges
People from Harford County, Maryland
Democratic Party members of the United States House of Representatives from Maryland
19th-century American politicians
United States federal judges admitted to the practice of law by reading law